Tauja (possibly from Quechua for heap, pile,) is a  mountain in the Cusco Region in Peru. It is situated in the Calca Province, San Salvador District, and in the Paucartambo Province, Caicay District, northeast of Huaypun. The Vilcanota River flows around its southern and western slopes. In the east the mountain is bordered by the Huancamayo (possibly from Quechua for "stone river"). It is a right tributary of the Vilcanota River. The confluence is south of the mountain.

See also 
 Pachatusan
 Pumacancha
 Curi

References 

Mountains of Peru
Mountains of Cusco Region